Beech Grove is an unincorporated community in Greene County, Arkansas, United States. Beech Grove has a post office with ZIP code 72412.

References

Unincorporated communities in Greene County, Arkansas
Unincorporated communities in Arkansas